Arthur Forster (born 3 August 1967 in Newcastle upon Tyne) is a British auto racing driver. He is currently competing in the UK MINI Challenge with his own Forster Motorsport team, and competed in the 2010 British Touring Car Championship for them.

Racing career
Forster competed in karting at club level in the 1980s. In 1994 he competed in the Ford Fiesta Challenge as a privateer. In 2002 he stepped up to the Mini Challenge, finishing second in 2004 before becoming champion in 2005. He was second outright again in 2006. He also competed in Britcar between 2005 and 2007 in a self-built Mini, winning a race outright at Snetterton in 2005. He also competed in the Silverstone 24 Hours with just one teammate after third driver and popstar Chris Rea withdrew due to illness.

In 2010 Forster Motorsport stepped up to the British Touring Car Championship, entering two BMW 320si cars, formerly driven by Mat Jackson, to be driven by Forster and teammate Martin Depper.

Racing record

Complete British Touring Car Championship results
(key) (Races in bold indicate pole position – 1 point awarded just in first race) (Races in italics indicate fastest lap – 1 point awarded all races) (* signifies that driver lead race for at least one lap – 1 point awarded all races)

References

External links
Official site
BTCC official site

Living people
English racing drivers
1967 births
British Touring Car Championship drivers
Mini Challenge UK drivers